Charles Henry Christian (July 29, 1916 – March 2, 1942) was an American swing and jazz guitarist. He was among the first electric guitarists and was a key figure in the development of bebop and cool jazz. He gained national exposure as a member of the Benny Goodman Sextet and Orchestra from August 1939 to June 1941. His single-string technique, combined with amplification, helped bring the guitar out of the rhythm section and into the forefront as a solo instrument. For this, he is often credited with leading to the development of the lead guitar role in musical ensembles and bands.

Early life
Christian was born in Bonham, Texas. His family moved to Oklahoma City, Oklahoma, when he was a small child. His parents were musicians. He had two brothers: Edward, born in 1906, and Clarence, born in 1911. Edward, Clarence, and Charlie were all taught music by their father, Clarence Henry Christian. Clarence Henry was struck blind by fever, and in order to support the family he and the boys worked as buskers, on what the Christians called "busts." He would have them lead him into the better neighborhoods, where they would perform for cash or goods. When Charles was old enough to go along, he first entertained by dancing.  Later he learned to play the guitar, inheriting his father's instruments upon his death when Charles was 12.

He attended Douglass School in Oklahoma City, where he was further encouraged in music by an instructor, Zelia N. Breaux. Charles wanted to play tenor saxophone in the school band, but she insisted he try trumpet instead. As he believed playing the trumpet would disfigure his lip, he quit to pursue his interest in baseball, at which he excelled.

In a 1978 interview with biographer Craig McKinney, Clarence Christian said that in the 1920s and 1930s, Edward Christian led a band in Oklahoma City as a pianist and had a shaky relationship with the trumpeter James Simpson. Around 1931, Simpson instructed guitarist "Bigfoot" Ralph Hamilton to secretly school the younger Charles in jazz. Hamilton taught him to solo on three songs, "Rose Room", "Tea for Two", and "Sweet Georgia Brown". When the time was right he took Charles to one of the many after-hours jam sessions along "Deep Deuce" in Oklahoma City where Edward's band was performing, and after some encouragement, Edward allowed Charles to play. Edward was surprised that Charles knew the tunes, which were well received by the club.

Charles soon was performing locally and on the road throughout the Midwest, including states as far away as North Dakota and Minnesota. By 1936 he was playing electric guitar and had become a regional attraction. According to the record producer John Hammond, Christian jammed with many of the big-name performers traveling through Oklahoma City, including Teddy Wilson and Art Tatum. Mary Lou Williams, the pianist for Andy Kirk and His Clouds of Joy.

Career

National fame 

In 1939, Christian auditioned for John Hammond, who recommended him to bandleader Benny Goodman, who was only the fourth white bandleader to feature Black musicians in his live band. Goodman had previously heard electric guitarists Leonard Ware and Floyd Smith, among others, and he unsuccessfully tried to buy Smith's contract from bandleader Andy Kirk.

There are multiple accounts of Christian and Goodman's first meeting. The former recalled in a 1940 article in Metronome magazine, "I guess neither one of us liked what I played." Despite this, Christian claimed that Goodman invited him to a show that evening. According to another account, Hammond decided to install Christian as the band's guitarist without consulting Goodman.

Goodman's band, including Christian on guitar, played that night at Victor Hugo restaurant in Los Angeles. The bandleader called “Rose Room”, a tune he assumed Christian did not know. However, Christian knew the tune and took an unprecedented twenty choruses of improvisation; Goodman hired him as a member of the band as a result. In the course of a few days, Christian went from making $2.50 a night to $150 a week. 

Christian joined the newly formed Goodman Sextet in September 1939, which included Lionel Hampton, Fletcher Henderson, Artie Bernstein and Nick Fatool. 

Amateur recordings made in September 1939 in Minneapolis, Minnesota, by Jerry Newhouse, a Goodman aficionado, capture the newly hired Christian while on the road with Goodman and feature Goodman's tenor sax player Jerry Jerome and then-local bassist Oscar Pettiford. Taking multiple solos, Christian shows much the same improvisational skills later captured on the Minton's and Monroe's recordings in 1941, suggesting that he had already matured as a musician. The Minneapolis recordings include "Stardust", "Tea for Two", and "I've Got Rhythm", the latter a favorite of bop composers and jammers.

By February 1940 Christian dominated the jazz and swing guitar polls and was elected to the Metronome All Stars. In the spring of 1940, Goodman laid off most of his band, but he retained Christian, and in the fall of that year Goodman led a sextet with Christian, Count Basie, longtime Duke Ellington trumpeter Cootie Williams, former Artie Shaw tenor saxophonist Georgie Auld and later drummer Dave Tough. This all-star band dominated the jazz polls in 1941, including another election to the Metronome All Stars for Christian.

His work on the Goodman sextet sides "Soft Winds", "Till Tom Special", and "A Smo-o-o-oth One" show his use of few well-placed melodic notes. His work on the Sextet's recordings of the ballads "Stardust", "Memories of You", "Poor Butterfly", "I Surrender Dear" and "On the Alamo" and his work on "Profoundly Blue" with the Edmond Hall Celeste Quartet (1941) show hints of what was later called cool jazz. Although credited for very few, Christian composed many of the original tunes recorded by the Benny Goodman Sextet.

Bebop and Minton's Playhouse 
Christian was an important contributor to the music that became known as bop, or bebop. Some of the participants in those early after-hours affairs at Minton's Playhouse, where bebop was born, credit Christian with the name bebop, citing his humming of phrases as the onomatopoetic origin of the term.

Examples of Christian's bebop playing can be heard in a series of recordings made at Minton's Playhouse, an after-hours club located in the Hotel Cecil, at 210 West 118th Street in Harlem, by Jerry Newman, a student at Columbia University, on a portable disk recorder in 1941, in which Christian was accompanied by Joe Guy on trumpet, Kenny Kersey on piano and Kenny Clarke on drums. Christian's use of tension and release, a technique employed by Lester Young, Count Basie and later bop musicians, is also present on Newman's recording of "Stompin' at the Savoy." Further recordings were made in 1941, shortly before Christian's illness and death, at Clark Monroe's Uptown House, another late-night jazz haunt in Harlem, with Oran "Hot Lips" Page. Other recordings include the tenor sax player Don Byas. Beboppers "Dizzy" Gillespie and Thelonious Monk were regulars at the jam sessions, with Monk a regular in the Minton's house band.

Kenny Clarke claimed that "Epistrophy" and "Rhythm-a-Ning" were compositions by Christian, which Christian played with Clarke and Thelonious Monk at Minton's jam sessions. The "Rhythm-a-Ning" line is heard on "Down on Teddy's Hill" and behind the introduction on "Guy's Got to Go" from the Newman recordings. It is also a line from Mary Lou Williams's "Walkin' and Swingin'". Clarke further commented that Christian first showed him the chords to "Epistrophy" on a ukulele.

The Minton's and Uptown House recordings have been packaged under a number of different titles, including After Hours and The Immortal Charlie Christian. On the recordings, Christian can be heard taking multiple choruses on a single tune, playing long stretches of melodic ideas with ease.

Personal life
Charles fathered a daughter, Billie Jean Christian (December 23, 1932 – July 19, 2004) by Margretta Lorraine Downey of Oklahoma City.

In the late 1930s Christian contracted tuberculosis, and in early 1940 he was hospitalized for a short period in which the Goodman group was on hiatus because of Goodman's back trouble. Goodman was hospitalized in the summer of 1940 after a brief stay at Santa Catalina Island, California, where the band stayed when they were on the West Coast.

Christian returned home to Oklahoma City in late July 1940 and returned to New York City in September 1940. In early 1941, Christian resumed his hectic lifestyle, heading to Harlem for late-night jam sessions after finishing gigs with the Goodman Sextet and Orchestra in New York City. In June 1941 he was admitted to Seaview, a sanitarium on Staten Island in New York City. He was reported to be making progress, and DownBeat magazine reported in February 1942 that he and Cootie Williams were starting a band.

Death 
After a visit to the hospital that same month by the tap dancer and drummer Marion Joseph "Taps" Miller, Christian declined in health. He died March 2, 1942, at the age of 25. He was buried in an unmarked grave in Bonham, Texas. A Texas State Historical Commission Marker and headstone were placed in Gates Hill Cemetery in 1994. The location of the historical marker and headstone was disputed, and in March 2013, Fannin County, Texas, recognized that the marker was in the wrong spot and that Christian is buried under the concrete slab.

Style and influences

Christian stated he wanted his guitar to sound like a tenor saxophone. The French gypsy jazz guitarist Django Reinhardt had little influence on him, but Christian was obviously familiar with some of his recordings. The guitarist Mary Osborne recalled hearing him play Django's solo on "St. Louis Blues" note for note, but then following it with his own ideas.

By 1939 there had already been electric guitar soloists—Leonard Ware; George Barnes; Eddie Durham, who had recorded with Count Basie; Floyd Smith, who recorded "Floyd's Guitar Blues" with Andy Kirk and his Clouds of Joy in March 1939, using an amplified lap steel guitar; and the Western Swing pioneer Eldon Shamblin, who was playing with Bob Wills and his Texas Playboys.

Christian paved the way for the modern electric guitar sound that was followed by other pioneers, including T-Bone Walker, Eddie Cochran, Cliff Gallup, Scotty Moore, Franny Beecher, B.B. King, Chuck Berry, Carlos Santana and Jimi Hendrix. For this reason Christian was inducted in 1990 into the Rock and Roll Hall of Fame.

Christian's exposure was so great in the brief period he played with Goodman that he influenced not only guitarists but other musicians as well. The influence he had on "Dizzy" Gillespie, Charlie Parker, Thelonious Monk and Don Byas can be heard on their early bop recordings "Blue 'n' Boogie" and "Salt Peanuts". Other musicians, such as the trumpeter Miles Davis, cited Christian as an early influence. Indeed, Christian's "new" sound influenced jazz as a whole. He reigned supreme in the jazz guitar polls up to two years after his death.  Black Sabbath's first manager Jim Simpson describes the band's first song, "A Song for Jim" as an “absolute Charlie Christian takeoff.”

Instruments
 Epiphone Deluxe guitar (an acoustic archtop guitar), 1934–1937
 Gibson ES-150 guitar (sunburst finish, with dot inlays on the fingerboard), and EH-150 amplifier, 1937 or 1939 – April 1940
 Gibson ES-250 guitar (custom built by Gibson with a natural finish, a Super 400 tailpiece, and bowtie inlays on the fingerboard), April 1940 – February 1941. This instrument was re-discovered in 2002.
 Gibson ES-250 guitar (custom built by Gibson with a natural finish, an L-7 style neck, and custom inlays on the fingerboard), February 1941 – March 1942
 Gibson L-5 guitar (custom built by Gibson with a "Charlie Christian pickup" instead of a P-90). This guitar was delivered to Christian just prior to his death in March 1942. It was later owned by Tony Mottola.

The bar-style pickup used on the ES-150 and ES-250 became known as the "Charlie Christian pickup."

Legacy 

John Hammond and George T. Simon called Christian the best improvisational talent of the swing era. In the liner notes to the album Solo Flight: The Genius of Charlie Christian (Columbia, 1972), Gene Lees wrote that "Many critics and musicians consider that Christian was one of the founding fathers of bebop, or if not that, at least a precursor to it."

In 1966, 24 years after his death, Christian was inducted into the Down Beat Jazz Hall of Fame. In 1989 the Oklahoma Jazz Hall of Fame created its first seven inductions, which included Christian.

In 1990, Christian was inducted into the Rock and Roll Hall of Fame in the category Early Influence. In a 1985 interview with Frets magazine Jerry Garcia named Christian and Django Reinhardt as the two guitarists who most inspired his awe and emulation.

In 2006, Oklahoma City, where Christian was raised, renamed a street in its Bricktown entertainment district after the guitarist.

Discography
Christian never recorded as a leader. Compilations have been released of his sessions as a sideman in which he is a featured soloist, of practice and warm-up recordings for these sessions, and some lower-quality recordings of Christian's own groups performing in nightclubs, by amateur technicians.

With Benny Goodman
 Charlie Christian with the Benny Goodman Sextet and Orchestra (Columbia, 1955)
 Solo Flight: The Genius of Charlie Christian (Columbia, 1972) 
 The Genius of the Electric Guitar, 1939–1941 recordings (Columbia, 1987)
 The Benny Goodman Sextet Featuring Charlie Christian 1939–41 (Columbia, 1989)
 Solo Flight, with the Benny Goodman Sextet (Vintage Jazz Classics, 1991)
 Guitar Wizard (Le Jazz/Charly, 1993)
 Complete Studio Recordings (Definitive, 2000) 4-CD box set
 Complete Live Recordings (Definitive, 2001) 4-CD box set
 Radioland 1939–1941 (Fuel 2000/Varèse Sarabande, 2001)
 The Genius of the Electric Guitar ([Legacy Recordings|Columbia/Legacy]], 2002) 4-CD box set
 First Master of the Electric Guitar: Selected Broadcasts & Jam Sessions, Remastered (JSP, 2002) 4-CD box set
 Charlie Christian – The Original Guitar Genius (Proper, 2005) 4-CD box set
 The Genius of the Electric Guitar (Definitive, 2005)
 Solo Flight: Live! with the Benny Goodman Sextet (Definitive, 2008) 
 On the Air (Fuel 2000/Varèse Sarabande, 2009)
 Yale University Archives, Vol. 5: NBC Broadcast Recordings 1936-1943 (Nimbus, 2010)
 Electric, with the Benny Goodman Sextet and the Charlie Christian Quartet (Uptown, 2011)

With Lionel Hampton
 The Complete Lionel Hampton 1937–1941 (Bluebird, 1976) 6-LP box set

With others
 From Spirituals to Swing – Carnegie Hall Concerts 1938/39 (Vanguard, 1959) 2-LP

Filmography
 2005  Solo Flight: The Genius of Charlie Christian
 2007  Charlie Christian- The Life & Music of the Legendary Jazz Guitarist (Grossman Guitar Workshop)

Notes

References
 Broadbent, Peter  (2002). Charlie Christian, Solo Flight: The Story of the Seminal Electric Guitarist. Hal Leonard. .
 Centlivre, Kevin (1994). "Interview with Jerry Jerome"
 Centlivre, Kevin (1999). "Revisiting Charlie Christian".
 Feather, Leonard (reprint, 1977). Inside Jazz. Da Capo. .
 Goins, Wayne E.; McKinney, Craig (2005). A Biography of Charlie Christian, Jazz Guitar's King of Swing. .
 Lee, Amy (1940) "Charlie Christian Tried to Play Hot Tenor!" Metronome.  
 Marshall, Wolf (2002). "The Best of Charlie Christian" signature licks. Hal Leonard. .
 McKinney, Craig. Charles Christian: Musician.
 Savage, William W., Jr. (1983). Singing Cowboys and All That Jazz: A Short History of Popular Music in Oklahoma. Norman: University of Oklahoma Press, pp. 48–51. .
 Spring, Howard (1980). The Improvisational Style of Charlie Christian. York University.
 Valdes, Leo (1997). Solo Flight: The Charlie Christian Newsletter Leo Valdes.

External links

Charlie Christian, Style Analysis and Solo Examples
Deep Deuce History and photos
Charlie Christian, a biography by C.J Shearn
Gates Hill Cemetery

1916 births
1942 deaths
20th-century deaths from tuberculosis
20th-century American guitarists
African-American male guitarists
African-American jazz guitarists
American jazz guitarists
Bebop guitarists
Blue Note Records artists
Columbia Records artists
Tuberculosis deaths in New York (state)
Musicians from Oklahoma City
Swing guitarists
Guitarists from Oklahoma
Jazz musicians from Oklahoma
20th-century American male musicians
American male jazz musicians
20th-century African-American musicians